Matthew Brian Stevens (born June 14, 1973) is a former American football safety in the National Football League (NFL), who played for five different teams.  He played college football at Appalachian State University.

Stevens was paralyzed from the waist down in a motorcycle accident in 2007; however, by 2011 he had regained the ability to move through the use of special leg brace support.

Stevens was born in Northville, Michigan, but his family moved to Chapel Hill, North Carolina) when he was a child.  He attended Chapel Hill High School, graduating in 1991.

References

External links
 New England Patriots bio

1973 births
Living people
People from Chapel Hill, North Carolina
Players of American football from North Carolina
Players of American football from Michigan
American football safeties
Appalachian State Mountaineers football players
Buffalo Bills players
Philadelphia Eagles players
Washington Redskins players
New England Patriots players
Houston Texans players
People from Northville, Michigan
Chapel Hill High School (Chapel Hill, North Carolina) alumni